The 1990 Kerry Senior Football Championship was the 90th staging of the Kerry Senior Football Championship since its establishment by the Kerry County Board in 1889. The championship ran from 6 July to 23 September 1990.

Laune Rangers entered the championship as the defending champions, however, they were beaten by Beale in the quarter-finals.

The final was played on 23 September 1990 at FitzGerald Stadium in Killarney, between West Kerry and Mid Kerry, in what was their first meeting in the final in 23 years. West Kerry won the match by 4-09 to 0-07 to claim their third championship title overall and a first title in five years. 

West Kerry's Murt Moriarty was the championship's top scorer with 6-08.

Results

Preliinary round

First round

Quarter-finals

Semi-finals

Final

Championship statistics

Top scorers

Overall

In a single game

References

Kerry Senior Football Championship
1990 in Gaelic football